Minuscule 831 (in the Gregory-Aland numbering), ε117 (von Soden), is an 11th-century Greek minuscule manuscript of the New Testament on parchment. The manuscript is lacunose.

Description 
The codex contains the text of the Gospel of Luke (19:25-25:53) and Gospel of John, on 69 parchment leaves (size ). The text is written in one column per page, 23 lines per page.
The original codex contained text of the four Gospels.

The numbers of the Ammonian Sections are given at the margin, but there are no references to the Eusebian Canons.

Text 
The Greek text of the codex is a representative of the Byzantine text-type. Hermann von Soden classified it to the textual family Kx. Kurt Aland placed it in Category V.

According to the Claremont Profile Method it represents the textual family Kx in Luke 20. In Luke 1 and Luke 10 the manuscript is defective, and textual profile in these chapters is not possible.

The Pericope Adulterae (John 7:53-8:11) is placed at the end of the Gospel of John.

History 

C. R. Gregory dated the manuscript to the 11th century, Scrivener to the 12th century. Currently the manuscript is dated by the INTF to the 11th century.

The manuscript was examined and described by Antonio Rocci in 1882. It was added to the list of New Testament manuscripts by Scrivener (629) and Gregory (831e). Gregory saw it in 1886.

Currently the manuscript is housed at the Biblioteca della Badia (A' α. 17), in Grottaferrata.

See also 

 List of New Testament minuscules
 Biblical manuscript
 Textual criticism
 Minuscule 830
 Minuscule 1356

References

Further reading 

 
 Antonio Rocci, Codices cryptenses, seu Abbatiae Cryptae Ferratae in Tusculano digesti et illustrati (Tusculanum 1883).

Greek New Testament minuscules
11th-century biblical manuscripts